Sres. Papis is a Chilean telenovela based on the Argentine telenovela of the same name. It premiered on Mega on June 28, 2016 and ended on March 6, 2017. It stars Francisco Melo, Jorge Zabaleta and Simón Pesutic.

The series revolves around three fathers who meet daily at the entrance of their children's kindergarten and touches topics such as friendship, parent-child relationship, love conflicts and changing social roles.

Plot 
Ignacio Moreno is a successful business executive, who likes to live a life of luxury, surrounded by women and is not interested in compromising. One day someone rings the bell of his apartment. Karina Urrutia, an old love, reveals to Ignacio that he is Johnny's dad. Karina decides to escape, however, Ignacio chases her but he is hit by Ema Díaz. As the days go by, Ignacio takes his son to school and gets a surprise, the teacher is the same woman who almost ran him over. At the school he meets two other parents. Julián Álvarez is a young father, who while working in his fast-food truck with his son Lucas, his in-laws suddenly appear. The father of his late girlfriend, Alberto Echeñique, along with his wife Ensenada Zúñiga, threatens him and tells him that he will do whatever it takes to take away Lucas, since he believes they will take better care of him. Fernando Pereira is a disoriented father who has found love after a separation. After doing his vegetable dance, Julián is visited by the police who want to take custody of his son to what he refuses. In addition, Ignacio and Fernando provoke the police, so the three parents end up in prison. After this meeting, the fathers start a strong friendship and must face new challenges and risks they may have.

Cast 
 Francisco Melo as Fernando Pereira
 Jorge Zabaleta as Ignacio Moreno
 Simón Pesutic as Julián Álvarez
 María Gracia Omegna as Emma Díaz
 Francisca Imboden as Maricarmen Riveros
 Francisca Walker as Valentina Salamanca
 Diego Muñoz as Gustavo Olavarría
 Katyna Huberman as Paula Rosende
 Maricarmen Arrigorriaga as María Teresa Velasco
 Hernán Lacalle as Alberto Echeñique
 Rodrigo Muñoz as Benito Soto "Sotito"
 Claudio Arredondo as Benni Velasco
 Eduardo Barril as Álvaro Salamanca
 Solange Lackington as Guacolda Olavarría
 Antonia Giesen as Verónica Echeñique
 Paula Luchsinger as Ignacia Pereira
 Li Fridman as Ensenada Zúñiga
 Constanza Mackenna as Antonia Fernández
 Ignacio Massa as Vicente Zúñiga
 Diego Guerrero as Johnny Moreno
 Hellen Mrugalski as Sofía Pereira
 Beltrán Izquierdo as Lucas Álvarez
 Pelusa Troncoso as Carmen Flores
 Lorena Capetillo as Karina Urrutia
 Consuelo Holzapfel as Myriam Moreno
 Julio Milostich as Eduardo "Lalo" Bachi
 Viviana Rodríguez as Blanca Harris
 Gabriela Hernández as María Elena "Nena" Larrondo
 Felipe Castro as Bernardo Salamanca
 Álvaro Espinoza as Tomás Ovalle
 Ingrid Cruz as Francisca Ferrada
 Carmen Gloria Bresky as Cecilia "Chechi" Agüero
 María José Necochea as María José Montalba
 Felipe Contreras as Marcos Meléndez
 Francisco Puelles as Rafael Miranda
 Nicolás Oyarzún as Joaquín Cantillana
 Matías Gil as Gonzalo "El Rana" Elizalde
 Mireya Sotoconil as Mónica Díaz
 Seide Costa as Salomé Vélez
 Jacqueline Boudon as Berta Mardones
 Héctor Aguilar as Emilio Quiroz
 Paulina Hunt as Inés Soto
 Patricia Irribarra as Lissette
 Pablo Striano as Doctor Cárdenas
 Luz María Yacometti as Gilda Bejarano

Ratings

References

External links 
 

2016 Chilean television series debuts
2017 Chilean television series endings
2016 telenovelas
Chilean telenovelas
Mega (Chilean TV channel) telenovelas
Spanish-language telenovelas